Albert Fisher (born September 7, 1986) is an American retired professional basketball guard. He played in college for the Kent State Golden Flashes. He led the team to the 2008 NCAA tournament while averaging 14 points per game. The Mid-American Conference Player of the Year that season, Fisher made several big shots during the Flashes' run to the tournament.

Fisher played for Pennsauken High School during his prep years. He spent his first two years at Siena College in New York and Redlands Community College in Oklahoma before transferring to Kent State.

References

1986 births
Living people
American expatriate basketball people in Israel
American expatriate basketball people in Turkey
American men's basketball players
Basketball players from New Jersey
Guards (basketball)
Ironi Ramat Gan players
Junior college men's basketball players in the United States
Kent State Golden Flashes men's basketball players
Pennsauken High School alumni
People from Pennsauken Township, New Jersey
Siena Saints men's basketball players
Sportspeople from Camden County, New Jersey